NGC 6801 is a spiral galaxy in the constellation of Cygnus. It was discovered by Lewis A. Swift on August 5, 1886.

Supernovae
In May 2011 a Type Ia supernova, 2011df, was detected in NGC 6801. 2015af, a Type II supernova was discovered in August 2015.

References

Unbarred spiral galaxies
Cygnus (constellation)
6801
08981
50063